Gale is a given name. It has seen masculine and feminine use consecutively in the United States.
Gale as a man's name is from an English surname, ultimately from Middle English gaile "jovial".
As a woman's name, it is a short form of the biblical name Abigail. It can also be used as a form of the name Galen, a name derived from that of the ancient Greek physician, meaning "tranquil."

It was almost exclusively a masculine name before 1935; in the later 1930s, it became a popular variant of the feminine name Abigail. Feminine usage surpassed masculine usage in 1940, leading to a further decline in masculine usage, and Gale was predominantly a feminine name when it peaked in popularity in the later 1950s. Its popularity decreased rapidly in the 1960s, falling below rank 1,000 in 1971. In the 1990 census, it was ranked 4,209.

People called Gale

Men
Gale Gordon (1906–1995), American actor
Gale Harold (born 1969), American actor
Gale McGee (1915–1992), United States Senator from Wyoming
Gale Sayers (1943–2020), American professional football player (Chicago Bears, 1965–1971)
Gale Wade (1929-2022), American baseball player

Women
Gale Ann Hurd (born 1955), American film producer and screenwriter
Gale Benson (1944–1972), British model and socialite 
Gale Garnett (born 1942), Canadian singer/actress/writer
Gale Norton (born 1954), 48th United States Secretary of the Interior
Gale Sondergaard (1899–1985), American actress

Pseudonym
Gale Storm, pseudonym of Josephine Owaissa Cottle (1922–2009), American actress

Fictional characters
Gale Boetticher, from the TV series Breaking Bad
 Gale Weathers, from the Scream films
 Gale Hawthorne, from The Hunger Games
 Gale, a supporting protagonist of the webcomic Acception
 Gale, a female violet-backed starling in Angry Birds Stella and The Angry Birds Movie
Gale, a female wind spirit from Frozen 2
Gale, a Chromatic rarity brawler, from the Supercell game Brawl Stars

References

See also
Gaël (given name)
Gale (surname)
Gail (given name)
Gayle (given name)
Gale (disambiguation)
Gael (disambiguation)
Galen (disambiguation)

English masculine given names